The Nederlandse Waterschapsbank (NWB Bank) is a Dutch specialist financial institution that providing funding for water boards and local government organisations in the Netherlands.  It is a Local Government Funding Agency owned by the Dutch Water boards and provinces.  It has been using the trading name NWB Bank since 2009.

Although a registered bank, it only lends to Dutch government entities and does not provide any services to individuals or companies.

History
Starting in the 1950s the water board union regularly lent money to the individual Water Boards.  However the union was not well equipped to handle the banking and lending activities and so on December 19, 1952 it decided to set up a separate water board bank to handle this task.  The bank would raise risk less capital from the water boards and later other government organisations and lend this out to the water boards as required.  The main aim was to provide the cheapest possible source of funding for the government entities.

The disaster caused by the North Sea flood of 1953 sped up the development of the bank and on May 5, 1954 the bank was established as Limited company by the 142 water boards of the Netherlands.

The bank is wholly owned by a diverse set of Dutch government entities and only the Dutch state and local entities may be shareholders in the bank. Based on 2013 data, 81% is held by the Dutch water boards, 17% by the Dutch government and 2% by the provinces.

Activities
The NWB Bank provides credit to local authorities, provinces, public institutions in the area of public housing, public health services and education and for water and environmental projects.

The bank raises funds on the international money and capital markets on the basis of a very strong balance sheet and high credit rating.  The Nederlandse Waterschapsbank has a Triple A rating from Moody's and Standard & Poor's (January 2012) and was placed 6th in the Global Finance's worlds 50th safest banks in 2013.

As the banks customers are government entities with very high credit ratings the risk of default is very low, as of 2011 it had a very high Basel tier 1 ratio of 90%.

References

External links
NWB Bank (english)

Banks of the Netherlands
Banks established in 1954
1954 establishments in the Netherlands
Banks under direct supervision of the European Central Bank
Water boards (Netherlands)
Local government finance
Government-owned banks
Government-owned companies of the Netherlands